Trần Tuấn Minh (born 21 October 1997) is a Vietnamese chess Grandmaster (GM) (2017), three-times Vietnamese Chess Championships winner (2017, 2018, 2021).

Biography
Trần Tuấn Minh twice in row won Vietnamese Chess Championships in 2017 and 2018.

Trần Tuấn Minh played for Vietnam in the Chess Olympiad:
 In 2018, at third board in the 43rd Chess Olympiad in Batumi (+4, =4, -3).

In 2014, he was awarded the FIDE International Master (IM) title and received the FIDE Grandmaster (GM) title three years later.

References

External links
 
 
 

1997 births
Sportspeople from Hanoi
Living people
Vietnamese chess players
Chess grandmasters
Chess Olympiad competitors
Competitors at the 2021 Southeast Asian Games
Southeast Asian Games competitors for Vietnam
21st-century Vietnamese people